Daptinus is an extinct genus of ichthyodectid fishes within the subfamily Saurodontinae, from the Late Cretaceous (Coniacian-Campanian) Niobrara Formation of Alabama, that was originally named as a species of Saurocephalus (S. phlebotomus) in 1870 by Edward Drinker Cope, and then became a species of Saurodon in 1871, but was moved to a separate genus in 1873. Subsequent authors listed Daptinus as a tentative, possible synonym of Saurocephalus or Saurodon leanus. The holotype, which is probably the only known specimen discovered to date, is AMNH 1906, which is listed as containing vertebrae (?) and portions of the cranium, the latter including the dentary, maxilla and palate.

References 

Ichthyodectidae
Prehistoric ray-finned fish genera
Fossil taxa described in 1870